An engine stand is a tool commonly used to repair large heavy gasoline or diesel engines. It uses a heavy cantilevered support structure to hold the engine in midair so that the mechanic has access to any exposed surface of the engine.

The engine stand is commonly used in combination with the engine crane to remove or install an engine in a vehicle, break in that engine, and perform repairs.

Motivation 
While small single-piston engines can commonly be laid on a table for repair, a large engine is normally meant to be supported from its engine mounts or from the flywheel transmission case mounts, and fragile components such as oil pans and valve covers would be crushed if the large engine were placed on a flat surface.

Construction 
Engine stands are typically mounted on large casters so than an engine can be moved around the shop to different test and repair stations, and the engine can often be rotated in midair to provide easier access to underside surfaces of the engine.

Safety standards 
National and international standards have been developed to standardize the safety and performance requirements for engine stands and other lifting devices. Selection of the standard is an agreement between the purchaser and the manufacturer, and has some significance in the design of the engine stand. In the United States, ASME has developed the Safety Standard for Portable Automotive Service Equipment, last revised in 2014, including requirements for hydraulic hand jacks, engine stands, and other lifting devices.

Gallery

References

External links 
 Historical example of an early engine stand that could be rotated to permit work on the underside of the engine – 

Automotive tools